The Louros Valles are a system of valleys on the planet Mars in the Coprates quadrangle. They sit on the southern edge of Ius Chasma. They are east of Noctis Labyrinthus. They display many layers in their sidewalls. Many other places on Mars also show rocks arranged in layers. Rock layers can be formed by volcanoes, wind, or water.
A detailed discussion of layering with many Martian examples can be found in Sedimentary Geology of Mars.

The Louros Valles are centered at 8.41 S and 278.23 E, and were named after a modern river in Greece. The name was approved in 1982.

The following set of images start with wide views of the whole planet that are centered near the Louros Valles. They transition to close views with enlarged HiRISE images.

References 

Valleys and canyons on Mars
Coprates quadrangle